The Teenage Textbook Movie is a film adaptation of Adrian Tan's bestselling 1988 novel The Teenage Textbook. It is a lighthearted look at the lives of four students in Singapore as they start junior college.

Premise
When Mui Ee attends Paya Lebar Junior College with her best friend Sissy Song, she encounters a new life form: boys. There are many, but only one will win her heart.

Cast 
 Melody Chen
 Caleb Goh
 Lim Hwee Sze
 Adrian Tan

Reception
Yong Siew Fern of The New Paper rated the film 3 stars out of 5 and wrote that "Unobtrusive acting and music-video editing combine to make this movie very much like your teen years - it will pass at its strolling pace, but it will be entertaining."

References

External links
 

1998 films
Films based on Singaporean novels
Singaporean comedy films
1998 comedy films
1990s English-language films